Yves Brodeur (born 1953) is a current Canadian diplomat. He was Ambassador Extraordinary and Plenipotentiary to Turkey and ambassador to Azerbaijan, Turkmenistan and Georgia from August 2005 to October 2007.

In 2011, Brodeur became Canada's permanent representative to the North Atlantic Treaty Organization (NATO).

References

External links 
 Foreign Affairs and International Trade Canada Complete List of Posts

1953 births
Living people
Place of birth missing (living people)
Ambassadors of Canada to Turkey
Ambassadors of Canada to Azerbaijan
Ambassadors of Canada to Turkmenistan
Ambassadors of Canada to Georgia (country)
Permanent Representatives of Canada to NATO